Abraham Mendel Theben (before 1730 – 1768) was the head of the Jewish community in the Kingdom of Hungary.

Mendel Theben was the son of Menahem Mendel Theben (died in 1730), leader of the Jewish community in Pressburg. He maintained a close relationship with the Habsburg court and Austrian aristocracy. He used his influence to promote the interests of his people, personally travelling to Vienna to intervene with Maria Theresa, Queen of Hungary, on behalf of Jews who had been imprisoned for a blood libel in the village of Orkuta. Mendel Theben was a special favourite of the Empress-Queen despite her strong Judeophobia and she listened to him with sympathy.

He was the father of Jacob Mendel Theben. His daughter was married to the son of Jonathan Eybeshutz.

References

Bibliography 

 Patai, Raphael: The Jews of Hungary: history, culture, psychology Wayne State University Press 1996 

Year of birth unknown
1768 deaths
Politicians from Bratislava
Hungarian Jews
Year of birth uncertain